Crescent Cottage is a building in Luss, Argyll and Bute, Scotland. It is a Category B listed structure, dating to the mid-19th century.

The building, a single-storey cottage located at the northeastern corner of Pier Road and School Road, is made of whinstone and sandstone rubble with ashlar margins and dressings. It has advanced bracketed eaves. It possesses timber diamond-pane casement windows and sandstone octagonal ridge chimney stacks with octagonal cans. It is a variant of the common form of cottage found elsewhere on the street.

The building is shown on the first-edition Ordnance Survey map, surveyed in 1864.

See also
List of listed buildings in Luss, Argyll and Bute

References

External links
View of the building – Google Street View, October 2016

19th-century establishments in Scotland
Listed buildings in Luss, Argyll and Bute
Category B listed buildings in Argyll and Bute